Pseudeva is a genus of moths of the family Noctuidae.

Species
 Pseudeva palligera Grote, 1881
 Pseudeva purpurigera Walker, 1858

References
 Natural History Museum Lepidoptera genus database
 Pseudeva at funet.fi

Plusiinae